Guzmania alborosea is a species of plant in the family Bromeliaceae. It is endemic to Ecuador.  Its natural habitats are subtropical or tropical moist lowland forests and subtropical or tropical moist montane forests.

References

alborosea
Endemic flora of Ecuador
Vulnerable plants
Taxonomy articles created by Polbot